Diego Gutiérrez de Humanes (1607-1660s) was a Spanish politician and military man, who served in the Viceroyalty of Peru as Lieutenant Governor of the Santa Fe, Argentina.

Biography 

He was born 1607 in Buenos Aires, the son of Pedro Gutiérrez and Mayor Humanés de Molina, belonging to a distinguished Spanish family. He was married to Leonor Carbajal, daughter of Gonzalo Carbajal and María de Salas y Reynoso. In 1633 Diego Gutiérrez de Humanes, was elected Alcalde de la santa hermandad, in the town of Monte Grande. His brother Juan Gutierrez de Humanes, served as Alcalde of second vote in Buenos Aires in 1648.

Diego Gutiérrez de Humanes, and his brother had received land grant in Parana, Santa Lucía, and in the present territories of San Pedro and Arrecifes.

References

External links 
www.sanpedro.com.ar

People from Buenos Aires
Argentine people of Spanish descent
Spanish military personnel
Argentine Army officers
Spanish colonial governors and administrators
1607 births
Year of death unknown